Richard Alexander may refer to:

Richard Alexander (TV presenter) (active since 2003), British actor and TV presenter
Richard Alexander (British politician) (1934–2008), Conservative British politician
Richard Alexander (exonerated convict), 1998 wrongfully convicted American
Richard Alexander (actor) (1902–1989), character actor
Richard Alexander (field hockey) (born 1981), English field hockey defender
Richard D. Alexander (1929–2018), professor and zoologist
Richard Jay-Alexander (born 1953), Broadway producer and director
Richard L. Alexander (1914–1993), American pilot
Richard Thomas Alexander (1887–1971), American educator and education theorist
Richard Dykes Alexander (1788–1865), businessman and philanthropist
Dick Alexander (active since 1975), American sound engineer

See also